Shuming Nie is a Chinese-American chemist. He is the Grainger Distinguished Chair in Bioengineering at the University of Illinois at Urbana-Champaign. He was the Wallace H. Coulter Distinguished Faculty Chair in Biomedical Engineering at Emory University. In 2007, Nie was elected as a fellow of the American Institute for Medical and Biological Engineering (AIMBE). In 2012, Nie was elected as a fellow of the American Association for the Advancement of Science (AAAS).

He is a pioneer of single-molecular SERS. He is one of the pioneers of quantum dots for biomedical imaging.

Recent publications
 Shuming Nie. "Remembering Dr. Richard P. Van Duyne (1945–2019): Gentleman, Scholar, and Surface-Enhanced Raman Scattering Pioneer". ACS Nano 2020, 14(1), 26-27. https://pubs.acs.org/doi/10.1021/acsnano.9b09759

 
 
 Warren C. W. Chan, Shuming Nie. Quantum Dot Bioconjugates for Ultrasensitive Nonisotopic Detection. Science  1998. 281(5385): 2016-2018.https://www.science.org/doi/10.1126/science.275.5303.1102
 Shuming Nie, Steven R. Emory. Probing Single Molecules and Single Nanoparticles by Surface-Enhanced Raman Scattering. Science  1997. 275(5303): 1102-1106. https://www.science.org/doi/10.1126/science.275.5303.1102

See also 
 Surface-enhanced Raman spectroscopy
 Quantum dot
 Paul Alivisatos
 Warren Chan

References 

Living people
21st-century American chemists
Chinese chemists
Chinese emigrants to the United States
Emory University faculty
Fellows of the American Association for the Advancement of Science
Nankai University alumni
Northwestern University alumni
Stanford University alumni
University of Illinois Urbana-Champaign faculty
Year of birth missing (living people)